The 2022 Qatar Total Open, known also as Qatar TotalEnergies Open, was a professional women's tennis tournament played on outdoor hard courts. It was the 20th edition of the event and a non-mandatory WTA 1000 tournament on the 2022 WTA Tour. It took place at the International Tennis and Squash complex in Doha, Qatar, during 20–26 February 2022.

Point distribution

Prize money 

*per team

Champions

Singles

  Iga Świątek def.  Anett Kontaveit, 6–2, 6–0

This was Świątek's fourth WTA singles title, and first of the year.

Doubles

  Coco Gauff /  Jessica Pegula def.  Veronika Kudermetova /  Elise Mertens, 3–6, 7–5, [10–5]

Singles main-draw entrants

Seeds

1 Rankings as of February 14, 2022

Other entrants
The following players received wildcards into the singles main draw:
  Alizé Cornet
  Caroline Garcia
  İpek Öz
  Mayar Sherif
  Vera Zvonareva

The following players received entry from the qualifying draw:
  Océane Dodin
  Beatriz Haddad Maia
  Kaja Juvan
  Marta Kostyuk 
  Andrea Petkovic
  Aliaksandra Sasnovich
  Stefanie Vögele
  Zhang Shuai

The following players received entry as lucky losers:
  Jaqueline Cristian
  Arantxa Rus

Withdrawals
Before the tournament
  Ekaterina Alexandrova → replaced by  Amanda Anisimova
  Danielle Collins → replaced by  Irina-Camelia Begu
  Anhelina Kalinina → replaced by  Arantxa Rus
  Anastasia Pavlyuchenkova → replaced by  Alison Van Uytvanck
  Karolína Plíšková → replaced by  Ana Konjuh
  Markéta Vondroušová → replaced by  Jaqueline Cristian
  Tamara Zidanšek → replaced by  Ann Li
 During the tournament
  Victoria Azarenka (left hip injury)
 Retirements
  Jaqueline Cristian (knee injury) 
  Petra Kvitová (left wrist injury)

Doubles main-draw entrants

Seeds 

 Rankings are as of February 14, 2022.

Other entrants
The following pairs received wildcards into the doubles main draw:
  Mubarka Al-Naemi /  İpek Öz
  Mirjam Björklund /  Emily Webley-Smith

The following pair received entry as alternates:
  Oksana Kalashnikova /  Maryna Zanevska

Withdrawals
Before the tournament
  Vivian Heisen /  Xu Yifan → replaced by  Oksana Kalashnikova /  Maryna Zanevska

References

External links
 

Qatar Total Open
Qatar Ladies Open
2022 in Qatari sport
Qatar Total Open